The 2011 Jackson State Tigers football team represented Jackson State University as a member of the East Division of the Southwestern Athletic Conference (SWAC) during the 2011 NCAA Division I FCS football season. Led by sixth-year head coach Rick Comegy, the Tigers compiled an overall record of 9–2 with a mark of 7–2 in conference play, sharing SWAC East Division title with Alabama A&M and Alabaam State. Alabama A&M advanced to SWAC Football Championship Game by virtue of a head-to-head win over the Alabama State, while Southern was ineligible for postseason play due to low Academic Progress Rate (APR) scores. The Tigers played their home games at Mississippi Veterans Memorial Stadium in Jackson, Mississippi

Schedule

References

Jackson State
Jackson State Tigers football seasons
Jackson State Tigers football